The Reeves AN/TSQ-96 Bomb Directing Central was a Cold War automatic tracking radar/computer/communications system ("Q" system).

Description 
The AN/TSQ-96 operated in India Band  monopulse variant of the conical scan Reeves AN/MSQ-77 Bomb Directing Central and had a solid state Univac 1219B computer with punch tape reader (Mark 152 fire control computer),  for ballistic calculation.  As with the MSQ-77, an analog vacuum tube computer converted radar range, azimuth, and elevation to cartesian coordinates, but the TSQ-96 used a digital radiometer for analog-to-digital conversion.    The TSQ-96 systems manufactured by Reeves Instrument Corporation were replaced  by the US Dynamics AN/TPQ-43 Radar Bomb Scoring Set ("Seek Score").

Sites
An AN/TSQ-96 was used for Vietnam War ground-directed bombing training at Bergstrom AFB in Austin TX and tracked flights at the Matagorda Island General Bombing and Gunnery Range.  Deployment of the central began at operating location 23 (OL-23) on Nakhon Phanom (NKP) RTAFB during the Vietnam War and in 1983, Radar Bomb Scoring Division Detachment 24 operated a TSQ-96 for Radar Bomb Scoring in Guam.  Detachment 1, 1 CEVG La Junta, CO also used a TSQ-96. This radar was the one at Keesler AFB and previously Bergstrom AFB. The set was packed up at Keesler AFB, Biloxi, MS by personnel from Detachment 8, 1 CEVG Richmond, KY and shipped to Detachment 1. Detachment 12, 1CEVG Hawthorne, NV had a TSQ-96 that had been transferred from Detachment 6, 1 CEVG Bayshore, MI.

References

1965 establishments in New York (state)
1965 in military history
1990 in military history
1990 disestablishments in the United States
Aerial warfare ground equipment
Cold War military computer systems of the United States
Ballistics
Ground radars
Military equipment of the Vietnam War
Radars of the United States Air Force
Austin–Bergstrom International Airport
Military equipment introduced in the 1960s